Siren Song is a song by Ukrainian singer Maruv, which won the  for the Eurovision Song Contest 2019 in Tel Aviv. However, due to a disagreement between Maruv and the broadcaster, she was forced to cancel her participation.

The music video for "Siren Song" was released on 5 April 2019.

Track listing
Digital download
"Siren Song" – 2:51

Charts

Weekly charts

Year-end charts

Certifications

Release history

See also
Ukraine in the Eurovision Song Contest 2019

References

2019 songs
2019 singles
English-language Ukrainian songs
Number-one singles in the Commonwealth of Independent States
Withdrawn Eurovision songs